Ukweli Roach (born 22 September 1986) is an English actor best known for playing the role of FBI psychiatrist Dr. Robert Borden, on the American television series Blindspot.

Career 
Roach's film credits include: Venus & the Sun, StreetDance 3D, Shakespeare's Globe: Romeo and Juliet, StreetDance: The Moves, One Day, Eternal Law, Monroe, Starlings, Drifters, Silk, Grantchester, The Royals, Dickensian, Anatole in TV series Humans 
and his main role as Dr. Robert Borden, an FBI psychiatrist on Blindspot.''

Filmography

Film

Television

References

External links
 

1986 births
Living people
English male television actors
Black British male actors
Male actors from Derbyshire
English people of Ghanaian descent